Harry McEntire (born September 14, 1990) is an English actor. He is known for his roles in Tower Block, for his numerous theatre roles, such as in the award-winning London production of Spring Awakening, for starring in the English localization of Xenoblade Chronicles 3 as Noah, and for playing Æthelwold in The Last Kingdom as a recurring character over the first two seasons and main cast in the third season.

He has won the Best Actor Manchester Theatre Award in 2015 for his role in Billy Liar, at the Royal Exchange Theatre.

Biography

Works

Video games

References

External links 
 

1990 births
English male film actors
Living people
21st-century English male actors